Below is a list of the populated places in Eskişehir Province, Turkey by district.  The first two districts, Odunpazarı and Tepebaşı, are parts of Greater Eskişehir. The first place in each list is the administrative center of the district.

Odunpazarı
 Odunpazarı
 Akçakaya, Odunpazarı
 Akkaya, Odunpazarı
 Akpınar, Odunpazarı
 Aşağıılıca, Odunpazarı
 Avdan, Odunpazarı
 Ayvacık, Odunpazarı
 Çamlıca, Odunpazarı
 Demirli, Odunpazarı
 Doğankaya, Odunpazarı
 Eşenkara, Odunpazarı
 Gülpınar, Odunpazarı
 Gümele, Odunpazarı
 Harmandalı, Odunpazarı
 İmişehir, Odunpazarı
 Kanlıpınar, Odunpazarı
 Karaalan, Odunpazarı
 Karacaşehir, Odunpazarı
 Karaçay, Odunpazarı
 Karamustafa, Odunpazarı
 Karapazar, Odunpazarı
 Karatepe, Odunpazarı
 Kargın, Odunpazarı
 Kayacık, Odunpazarı
 Kıravdan, Odunpazarı
 Kireç, Odunpazarı
 Kuyucak, Odunpazarı
 Lütfiye, Odunpazarı
 Musalar, Odunpazarı
 Sarısungur, Odunpazarı
 Seklice, Odunpazarı
 Sultandere, Odunpazarı
 Süpüren, Odunpazarı
 Türkmentokat, Odunpazarı
 Uluçayır, Odunpazarı
 Yahnikapan, Odunpazarı
 Yenisofça, Odunpazarı
 Yürükkaracaören, Odunpazarı
 Yürükkırka, Odunpazarı
 Yukarıçağlan, Odunpazarı
 Yukarıılıca, Odunpazarı
 Yukarıkalabak, Odunpazarı

Tepebaşı
 Tepebaşı
 Ahılar, Tepebaşı
 Aşağıkartal, Tepebaşı
 Atalan, Tepebaşı
 Atalantekke, Tepebaşı
 Avlamış, Tepebaşı
 Behçetiye, Tepebaşı
 Bektaşpınarı, Tepebaşı
 Beyazaltın, Tepebaşı
 Bozdağ, Tepebaşı
 Buldukpınar, Tepebaşı
 Cumhuriyet, Tepebaşı
 Çalkara, Tepebaşı
 Çanakkıran, Tepebaşı
 Danişment, Tepebaşı
 Gökçekısık, Tepebaşı
 Gündüzler, Tepebaşı
 Hekimdağ, Tepebaşı
 Karaçobanpınarı, Tepebaşı
 Karadere, Tepebaşı
 Karagözler, Tepebaşı
 Karahüyük, Tepebaşı
 Kızılcaören, Tepebaşı
 Kızılinler, Tepebaşı
 Kozlubel, Tepebaşı
 Mollaoğlu, Tepebaşı
 Musaözü, Tepebaşı
 Nemli, Tepebaşı
 Sulukaraağaç, Tepebaşı
 Takmak, Tepebaşı
 Tandır, Tepebaşı
 Taycılar, Tepebaşı
 Tekeciler, Tepebaşı
 Turgutlar, Tepebaşı
 Uludere, Tepebaşı
 Yakakayı, Tepebaşı
 Yarımca, Tepebaşı
 Yeniakçayır, Tepebaşı
 Yeniincesu, Tepebaşı
 Yukarıkartal, Tepebaşı
 Yusuflar, Tepebaşı
 Yürükakçayır, Tepebaşı

Alpu
 Alpu
 Ağaçhisar, Alpu
 Aktepe, Alpu
 Alapınar, Alpu
 Arıkaya, Alpu
 Bahçecik, Alpu
 Başören, Alpu
 Belkese, Alpu
 Bozan, Alpu
 Büğdüz, Alpu
 Çardakbaşı, Alpu
 Çukurhisar, Alpu
 Dereköy, Alpu
 Esence, Alpu
 Fevziye, Alpu
 Gökçekaya, Alpu
 Gökçeoğlu, Alpu
 Güneli, Alpu
 Güroluk, Alpu
 Işıkören, Alpu
 Karacaören, Alpu
 Karakamış, Alpu
 Osmaniye, Alpu
 Özdenk, Alpu
 Sakarıkaracaören, Alpu
 Sarıkavak, Alpu
 Söğütçük, Alpu
 Uyuzhamamköyü, Alpu
 Yayıklı, Alpu
 Yeşildon, Alpu

Beylikova
 Beylikova
 Akgüney, Beylikova
 Akköprü, Beylikova
 Aşağıdudaş, Beylikova
 Aşağıiğdeağacı, Beylikova
 Doğanoğlu, Beylikova
 Doğray, Beylikova
 Emircik, Beylikova
 Gökçeayva, Beylikova
 Halilbağı, Beylikova
 İkipınar, Beylikova
 İmikler, Beylikova
 Kızılcaören, Beylikova
 Okçu, Beylikova
 Parsıbey, Beylikova
 Sultaniye, Beylikova
 Süleymaniye, Beylikova
 Uzunburun, Beylikova
 Yalınlı, Beylikova
 Yeniyurt, Beylikova
 Yukarıdudaş, Beylikova
 Yukarıiğdeağacı, Beylikova

Çifteler
 Çifteler
 Abbashalimpaşa, Çifteler
 Arslanlı, Çifteler
 Başkurt, Çifteler
 Belpınar, Çifteler
 Çatmapınar, Çifteler
 Dikilikaya, Çifteler
 Dikmen, Çifteler
 Doğanay, Çifteler
 Eminekin, Çifteler
 Hayriye, Çifteler
 Ilıcabaşı, Çifteler
 Kadıkuyusu, Çifteler
 Körhasan, Çifteler
 Orhaniye, Çifteler
 Ortaköy, Çifteler
 Osmaniye, Çifteler
 Sadıroğlu, Çifteler
 Saithalimpaşa, Çifteler
 Sarıkavak, Çifteler
 Yenidoğan, Çifteler
 Yıldızören, Çifteler
 Zaferhamit, Çifteler

Günyüzü
 Günyüzü
 Atlas, Günyüzü
 Ayvalı, Günyüzü
 Bedil, Günyüzü
 Beyyayla, Günyüzü
 Çakmak, Günyüzü
 Çardaközü, Günyüzü
 Doğray, Günyüzü
 Tutlu, Günyüzü
 Gecek, Günyüzü
 Gümüşkonak, Günyüzü
 Kavacık, Günyüzü
 Kavuncu, Günyüzü
 Kayakent, Günyüzü
 Kuzören, Günyüzü
 Yazır, Günyüzü
 Yeşilyaka, Günyüzü

Han
 Han
 Ağlarca, Han
 Akdere, Han
 Akhisar, Han
 Başara, Han
 Gökçekuyu, Han
 Gökçeyayla, Han
 Hankaraağaç, Han
 İskankuyu, Han
 Kayı, Han
 Peçene, Han
 Yazılı, Han

İnönü
 İnönü
 Aşağıkuzfındık, İnönü
 Dereyalak, İnönü
 Dutluca, İnönü
 Erenköy, İnönü
 Esnemez, İnönü
 Kümbet, İnönü
 Kümbetakpınar, İnönü
 Kümbetyeniköy, İnönü
 Oklubalı, İnönü
 Seyitaliköyü, İnönü
 Yukarıkuzfındık, İnönü
 Yürükyayla, İnönü

Mahmudiye
 Mahmudiye
 Akyurt, Mahmudiye
 Balçıkhisar, Mahmudiye
 Doğanca, Mahmudiye
 Fahriye, Mahmudiye
 Güllüce, Mahmudiye
 Hamidiye, Mahmudiye
 İsmetpaşa, Mahmudiye
 Kaymazyayla, Mahmudiye
 Mesudiye, Mahmudiye
 Şerefiye, Mahmudiye
 Tokathan, Mahmudiye
 Topkaya, Mahmudiye
 Türkmenmecidiye, Mahmudiye
 Yeniköy, Mahmudiye
 Yeşilyurt, Mahmudiye

Mihalgazi
 Mihalgazi
 Alpagut, Mihalgazi
 Bozaniç, Mihalgazi
 Demirciler, Mihalgazi
 Karaoğlan, Mihalgazi
 Sakarıılıca, Mihalgazi

Mihalıççık
 Mihalıççık
 Adahisar, Mihalıcçık
 Ahur, Mihalıcçık
 Ahurözü, Mihalıcçık
 Akçaören, Mihalıcçık
 Aydınlar, Mihalıcçık
 Bahtiyar, Mihalıcçık
 Belen, Mihalıcçık
 Bey, Mihalıcçık
 Çalçı, Mihalıcçık
 Çalkaya, Mihalıcçık
 Çardak, Mihalıcçık
 Çukurören, Mihalıcçık
 Dağcı, Mihalıcçık
 Diközü, Mihalıcçık
 Dinek, Mihalıcçık
 Dümrek, Mihalıcçık
 Gözeler, Mihalıcçık
 Güce, Mihalıcçık
 Güreş, Mihalıcçık
 Gürleyik, Mihalıcçık
 Hamidiye, Mihalıcçık
 Ilıcalar, Mihalıcçık
 İğdecik, Mihalıcçık
 İkizafer, Mihalıcçık
 Karaçam, Mihalıcçık
 Karageyikli, Mihalıcçık
 Kavak, Mihalıcçık
 Kayı, Mihalıcçık
 Kızılbörüklü, Mihalıcçık
 Korucu, Mihalıcçık
 Koyunağılı, Mihalıcçık
 Kozlu, Mihalıcçık
 Lütfiye, Mihalıcçık
 Mahmuthisar, Mihalıcçık
 Narlı, Mihalıcçık
 Obruk, Mihalıcçık
 Otluk, Mihalıcçık
 Ömer, Mihalıcçık
 Saray, Mihalıcçık
 Sazak, Mihalıcçık
 Seki, Mihalıcçık
 Sekiören, Mihalıcçık
 Sorkun, Mihalıcçık
 Süleler, Mihalıcçık
 Tatarcık, Mihalıcçık
 Uşakbükü, Mihalıcçık
 Üçbaşlı, Mihalıcçık
 Yalımkaya, Mihalıcçık
 Yayla, Mihalıcçık
 Yeşilyurt, Mihalıcçık
 Yunusemre, Mihalıcçık

Sarıcakaya
 Sarıcakaya
 Beyköy, Sarıcakaya
 Beyyayla, Sarıcakaya
 Dağküplü, Sarıcakaya
 Düzköy, Sarıcakaya
 Güney, Sarıcakaya
 İğdir, Sarıcakaya
 Kapıkaya, Sarıcakaya
 Laçin, Sarıcakaya
 Mayıslar, Sarıcakaya

Seyitgazi
 Seyitgazi
 Akin, Seyitgazi
 Aksaklı, Seyitgazi
 Arslanbeyi, Seyitgazi
 Ayvalı, Seyitgazi
 Bardakçı, Seyitgazi
 Beşsaray, Seyitgazi
 Beykışla, Seyitgazi
 Büyükdere, Seyitgazi
 Büyükyayla, Seyitgazi
 Cevizli, Seyitgazi
 Çatören, Seyitgazi
 Çukurağıl, Seyitgazi
 Çukurca, Seyitgazi
 Çürüttüm, Seyitgazi
 Değişören, Seyitgazi
 Doğançayır, Seyitgazi
 Fethiye, Seyitgazi
 Gemiç, Seyitgazi
 Göcenoluk, Seyitgazi
 Gökbahçe, Seyitgazi
 Gökcegüney, Seyitgazi
 Göknebi, Seyitgazi
 Gümüşbel, Seyitgazi
 İdrisyayla, Seyitgazi
 İkizoluk, Seyitgazi
 Karacalık, Seyitgazi
 Karaören, Seyitgazi
 Kesenler, Seyitgazi
 Kırka, Seyitgazi
 Kümbet, Seyitgazi
 Numanoluk, Seyitgazi
 Oynaş, Seyitgazi
 Örencik, Seyitgazi
 Salihler, Seyitgazi
 Sancar, Seyitgazi
 Sandıközü, Seyitgazi
 Sarayören, Seyitgazi
 Sarıcailyas, Seyitgazi
 Şükranlı, Seyitgazi
 Taşlık, Seyitgazi
 Üçsaray, Seyitgazi
 Yapıldak, Seyitgazi
 Yarbasan, Seyitgazi
 Yazıdere, Seyitgazi
 Yenikent, Seyitgazi
 Yeşiltepe, Seyitgazi
 Yukarısöğüt, Seyitgazi

Sivrihisar
 Sivrihisar
 Ahiler, Sivrihisar
 Aktaş, Sivrihisar
 Aşağıkepen, Sivrihisar
 Aydınlı, Sivrihisar
 Babadat, Sivrihisar
 Bahçecik, Sivrihisar
 Ballıhisar, Sivrihisar
 Benlikuyu, Sivrihisar
 Benliyaver, Sivrihisar
 Beyyazı, Sivrihisar
 Biçer, Sivrihisar
 Böğürtlen, Sivrihisar
 Buhara, Sivrihisar
 Buzluca, Sivrihisar
 Çandır, Sivrihisar
 Çaykoz, Sivrihisar
 Demirci, Sivrihisar
 Dinek, Sivrihisar
 Dumluca, Sivrihisar
 Dümrek, Sivrihisar
 Elcik, Sivrihisar
 Ertuğrulköy, Sivrihisar
 Gerenli, Sivrihisar
 Göktepe, Sivrihisar
 Gülçayır, Sivrihisar
 Güvemli, Sivrihisar
 Hamamkarahisar, Sivrihisar
 Hüdavendigar, Sivrihisar
 İbikseydi, Sivrihisar
 İğdecik, Sivrihisar
 İlören, Sivrihisar
 İlyaspaşa, Sivrihisar
 İstiklalbağı, Sivrihisar
 Kadıncık, Sivrihisar
 Kaldırımköy, Sivrihisar
 Karaburhan, Sivrihisar
 Karacakaya, Sivrihisar
 Karacaören, Sivrihisar
 Karacaörenyaylası, Sivrihisar
 Karadat, Sivrihisar
 Karakaya, Sivrihisar
 Karkın, Sivrihisar
 Kaymaz, Sivrihisar
 Kertek, Sivrihisar
 Kınık, Sivrihisar
 Koçaş, Sivrihisar
 Koltan, Sivrihisar
 Kurtşeyh, Sivrihisar
 Memik, Sivrihisar
 Mülkköy, Sivrihisar
 Nasrettinhoca, Sivrihisar
 Oğlakçı, Sivrihisar
 Ortaklar, Sivrihisar
 Paşakadın, Sivrihisar
 Sadıkbağı, Sivrihisar
 Sarıkavak, Sivrihisar
 Selimiye, Sivrihisar
 Sığırcık, Sivrihisar
 Tekören, Sivrihisar
 Yaverören, Sivrihisar
 Yenidoğan, Sivrihisar
 Yeniköy, Sivrihisar
 Yeşilköy, Sivrihisar
 Yukarıkepen, Sivrihisar
 Zeyköyü, Sivrihisar

Recent development
According to Law act no 6360, all Turkish provinces with a population more than 750 000, were renamed as metropolitan municipality. All districts in those provinces became second level municipalities and all villages in those districts  were renamed as a neighborhoods. Thus the villages listed above are officially neighborhoods of Eskişehir.

References

Eskisehir
List